This is a list of works of Quino, the Argentine cartoonist. The list currently contains 13 Mafalda comic books and 19 humor books.

Mafalda
Quino published Mafalda strips from September 1964 to July 1973. Below is a selection of the books that have been released over the years.
 Mafalda 1 (1970)
 Mafalda 2 (1970)
 Mafalda 3 (1970)
 Mafalda 4 (1970)
 Mafalda 5 (1970)
 Mafalda 6 (1970)
 Mafalda 7 (1971)
 Mafalda 8 (1972)
 Mafalda 9 (1973)
 Mafalda 10 (1974)
 Mafalda inédita (Mafalda Unpublished, 1988)
 10 años con Mafalda (10 years with Mafalda, 1991)
 Toda Mafalda (All Mafalda, 1993)

Humor books
Below a selection of the humour books published.
 Mundo Quino (Quino World, 1963)
 ¡A mí no me grite! (Don't You Yell at Me!, 1972)
 Yo que usted... (If I Were You..., 1973)
 Bien gracias, ¿y usted? (Well Thank You, and You?, 1976)
 Hombres de bolsillo (Pocket Men, 1977)
 A la buena mesa (To Fine Dining, 1980)
 Ni arte ni parte (Neither Art nor Part, 1981)
 Déjenme inventar (Let Me Invent, 1983)
 Quinoterapia (Quinotherapy, 1985)
 Gente en su sitio (People in their Place, 1986)
 Sí, cariño (Yes, Dear, 1987)
 Potentes, prepotentes e impotentes (Powerful, Arrogant and Impotent, 1989)
 Humano se nace (As a Human One is Born, 1991)
 ¡Yo no fui! (I Didn't Do It!, 1994)
 ¡Qué mala es la gente! (How Bad People Are!, 1996)
 ¡Cuánta bondad! (How Much Goodness!, 1999)
 Esto no es todo (This is not All, 2002)
 ¡Qué presente impresentable! (What an Unpresentable Present!, 2005)
 La aventura de comer (The Adventure of Eating, 2007)

References

Works by Quino
Quino
Bibliographies of Argentine writers
Lists of comics by creator